Robert Neill McGarvey (August 14, 1888 – June 28, 1952) was a Republican member of the United States House of Representatives from Pennsylvania.

Robert McGarvey was born in Philadelphia.  He attended the University of Pennsylvania Business College.  He was engaged as a telegrapher and as manager of a news bureau.  He became an investment broker in 1922.

He was elected to Congress as a Republican in 1946 to the 80th United States Congress, defeating incumbent Democratic Congressman William T. Granahan.  As a congressman he was part of the Federal Commission that helped to designate Independence Hall as a National Historical Park. He was an unsuccessful candidate for reelection in 1948 in a re-match against Granahan.

Sources

The Political Graveyard

External links

References

1888 births
1952 deaths
Politicians from Philadelphia
Republican Party members of the United States House of Representatives from Pennsylvania
20th-century American politicians